The men's light heavyweight boxing competition at the 1998 Asian Games in Bangkok, Thailand was held from 9 to 18 December at the Land Sports Complex.

Like all Asian Games boxing events, the competition was a straight single-elimination tournament. This event consisted of 13 boxers. The competition began with the round of 16 on 9 December, where the number of competitors was reduced to 8, and concluded with the final on 18 December. As there were fewer than 16 boxers in the competition, a number of boxers received a bye through the preliminary round. Both semi-final losers were awarded bronze medals.

All bouts consisted of five three-minute rounds. The boxers receive points for every successful punch they land on their opponent's head or upper body. The boxer with the most points at the end of the bouts wins. If a boxer is knocked to the ground and cannot get up before the referee counts to 10 then the bout is over and the opponent wins.

Schedule
All times are Indochina Time (UTC+07:00)

Results
Legend
RSCH — Won by referee stop contest head blow
RSCI — Won by referee stop contest injury
RSCO — Won by referee stop contest outclassed

References

External links
Results

81